James Marion Asbell (June 22, 1914 – July 6, 1967) nicknamed "Big Train", was an outfielder in Major League Baseball for the Chicago Cubs. Nicknamed "Big Train", his career was a brief one, consisting of a single season, the Cubs' World Series year of 1938.

After a college career that included stints at both Tulane and Rice, Asbell signed with the New York Giants. After some time in the minors, the Cubs took Asbell in the 1937 Rule 5 draft. He made his major league debut with the Cubs on May 8, 1938. With the Cubs, Asbell appeared in just 17 games, playing only ten in the field. He committed no errors as a defender, but his offense was subpar, as he batted just .182 (6 for 33) with 2 doubles, 3 RBI, and no stolen bases. He played his last game as a Cub, and as a major leaguer, on October 2, 1938. He made no appearances with the club in the World Series.

Asbell died on July 6, 1967 in San Mateo, California.

References

1914 births
1967 deaths
Baseball players from Dallas
Beckley Miners players
Chicago Cubs players
Des Moines Demons players
Houston Buffaloes players
Jersey City Giants players
Knoxville Smokies players
Major League Baseball outfielders
Memphis Chickasaws players
New Orleans Pelicans (baseball) players
Portsmouth Truckers players
Rice Owls baseball players
Rochester Red Wings players
Sacramento Solons players